Bjørnstjerne Martinius Bjørnson (8 December 1832 – 26 April 1910) was a Norwegian writer who received the 1903 Nobel Prize in Literature "as a tribute to his noble, magnificent and versatile poetry, which has always been distinguished by both the freshness of its inspiration and the rare purity of its spirit". The first Norwegian Nobel laureate, he was a prolific polemicist and extremely influential in Norwegian public life and Scandinavian cultural debate. Bjørnson is considered to be one of the four great Norwegian writers, alongside Ibsen, Lie, and Kielland. He is also celebrated for his lyrics to the Norwegian national anthem, "Ja, vi elsker dette landet". The composer Fredrikke Waaler based a composition for voice and piano (Spinnersken) on a text by Bjørnson, as did Anna Teichmüller (Die Prinzessin).

Childhood and education

Bjørnson was born at the farmstead of Bjørgan in Kvikne, a secluded village in the Østerdalen district, some sixty miles south of Trondheim. In 1837 Bjørnson's father Peder Bjørnson, who was the pastor of Kvikne, was transferred to the parish of Nesset, outside Molde in Romsdal. It was in this scenic district that Bjørnson spent his childhood, living at the Nesset Parsonage.

After a few years studying in the neighbouring city Molde, Bjørnson was sent at the age of 17 to Heltberg Latin School (Heltbergs Studentfabrikk) in Christiania to prepare for university. This was the same school that trained Ibsen, Lie, and Vinje.

Bjørnson had realized that he wanted to pursue his talent for poetry (he had written verses since age eleven). He matriculated at the University of Oslo in 1852, soon embarking upon a career as a journalist, focusing on criticism of drama.

Early production
In 1857 Bjørnson published Synnøve Solbakken, the first of his peasant novels. In 1858 this was followed by Arne, in 1860 by En glad Gut (A Happy Boy), and in 1868 by Fiskerjentene (The Fisher Girls). These are the most important specimens of his bonde-fortellinger or peasant tales. At least seven Danish composers wrote music based on Arne: Morten Eskesen, C. J. Frydensberg, Peter Heise, Anton Nielsen, Oluf Ring, Henrik Rung, and Sigrid Henriette Wienecke.

Bjørnson was anxious "to create a new saga in the light of the peasant," as he put it, and he thought this should be done, not merely in prose fiction, but in national dramas or folke-stykker. The earliest of these was a one-act piece set in the 12th century, Mellem Slagene (Between the Battles), written in 1855 and produced in 1857. He was especially influenced at this time by the study of Jens Immanuel Baggesen and Adam Gottlob Oehlenschläger, during a visit to Copenhagen. Mellem Slagene was followed by Halte-Hulda (Lame Hulda) in 1858, and Kong Sverre (King Sverre) in 1861. His most important work to date was the poetic trilogy of Sigurd Slembe (Sigurd the Bad), which Bjørnson published in 1862.

The mature author
At the close of 1857 Bjørnson had been appointed director of the theatre at Bergen, a post which he held for two years, when he returned to Christiania. From 1860 to 1863 he travelled widely throughout Europe. Early in 1865 he undertook the management of the Christiania Theatre, and brought out his popular comedy of De Nygifte (The Newly Married) and his romantic tragedy of Mary Stuart in Scotland. In 1870 he published Poems and Songs and the epic cycle Arnljot Gelline; the latter volume contains the ode Bergliot, one of Bjørnson's finest contributions to lyrical poetry.

Between 1864 and 1874, Bjørnson displayed a slackening of the intellectual forces very remarkable in a man of his energy; he was mainly occupied with politics and with his business as a theatrical manager. This was the period of Bjørnson's most fiery propaganda as a radical agitator. In 1871 he began to supplement his journalistic work by delivering lectures throughout Scandinavia.

From 1874 to 1876 Bjørnson was absent from Norway, and in the peace of voluntary exile he recovered his imaginative powers. His new departure as a dramatic author began with En fallit (A Bankruptcy) and Redaktøren (The Editor) in 1874, social dramas of an extremely modern and realistic cast.

Collaborations with Grieg
In the 1870's Bjørnson and the composer Edvard Grieg, who shared his interests in Norwegian self-government, became friends. Grieg set several of his poems to music, including Landkjenning and Sigurd Jorsalfar.  Eventually they decided on an opera based on King Olav Trygvason, but a dispute as to whether music or lyrics should be created first, led to Grieg being diverted to working on incidental music for Henrik Ibsen's play Peer Gynt, which naturally offended Bjørnson . Eventually their friendship was resumed.

The "national poet"

Bjørnson settled on his estate of Aulestad in Gausdal. In 1877 he published another novel, Magnhild, in which his ideas on social questions were seen to be in a state of fermentation, and gave expression to his republican sentiments in the polemical play Kongen (The King). In a later edition of the play, he prefixed an essay on "Intellectual Freedom" in further explanation of his position. Kaptejn Mansana (Captain Mansana), an episode of the war of Italian independence, was written in to 1878.

Extremely anxious to obtain full success on the stage, Bjørnson concentrated his powers on a drama of social life, Leonarda (1879), which raised a violent controversy. A satirical play, Det nye System (The New System), was produced a few weeks later. Although these plays of Bjørnson's second period were greatly discussed, few were financially successful.

Bjørnson produced a social drama, En Handske (A Gauntlet), in 1883, but was unable to persuade any manager to stage it except in a modified form. In the autumn of the same year, Bjørnson published a mystical or symbolic drama Over Ævne (Beyond Powers), dealing with the abnormal features of religious excitement with extraordinary force; this was not acted until 1899, when it achieved a great success.

Political interests

From his youth and forwards, Bjørnson admired Henrik Wergeland, and became a vivid spokesman for the Norwegian Left-wing movement. In this respect, he supported Ivar Aasen, and joined forces in the political struggles in the 1860s and 1870s. When the great monument over Henrik Wergeland were to be erected in 1881, it came to political struggle between left and right, and the left-wing got the upper hand. Bjørnson presented the speech on behalf of Wergeland, and also honouring the constitution and the farmers.

Bjørnson's political opinions had brought upon him a charge of high treason, and he took refuge for a time in Germany, returning to Norway in 1882. Convinced that the theatre was practically closed to him, he turned back to the novel, and published in 1884 Det flager i Byen og paa Havnen (Flags are Flying in Town and Port), embodying his theories on heredity and education. In 1889 he printed another long and still more remarkable novel, Paa Guds veje (On God's Path), which is chiefly concerned with the same problems. The same year saw the publication of a comedy, Geografi og Kærlighed (Geography and Love), which met with success.

A number of short stories, of a more or less didactic character, dealing with startling points of emotional experience, were collected and published 1894. Later plays were a political tragedy called Paul Lange og Tora Parsberg (1898), a second part of Over Ævne (Beyond Powers II) (1895), Laboremus (1901), På Storhove (At Storhove) (1902), and Daglannet (Dag's Farm) (1904). In 1899, at the opening of the National Theatre, Bjørnson received an ovation, and his saga-drama of King Sigurd the Crusader was performed at the opening of Nationaltheatret in Oslo.

Bjørnson was one of the contributors of the anti-Union magazine, Ringeren, edited by Sigurd Ibsen in 1898.

A subject which interested him greatly was the question of the bondemaal, the adopting of a national language for Norway distinct from the dansk-norsk (Dano-Norwegian), in which most Norwegian literature had hitherto been written. At an early stage, before 1860, Bjørnson had himself experimented with at least one short story written in landsmål. The interest, however, did not last, and he soon abandoned this enterprise altogether. Afterwards, he regretted that he never felt he gained the mastery of this language. Bjørnson's strong and sometimes rather narrow patriotism did not blind him to what he considered the fatal folly of such a proposal, and his lectures and pamphlets against the målstræv in its extreme form were very effective. His attitude towards this must have changed sometime after 1881, as he still spoke on behalf of the farmers at this point. Although he seems to have been supportive of Ivar Aasen and friendly towards farmers (in the peasant-novels), he later denounced this, and stated in 1899 that there was limits to a farmer's cultivation. I can draw a line on the wall. The farmer can cultivate himself to this level, and no more, he wrote in 1899. Rumour has it that he had been insulted by a farmer at some point, and uttered the statement in sheer anger. In 1881, he spoke of the farmer's clothing borne by Henrik Wergeland, and his opinion then states that this garment, worn by Wergeland, was "of the most influential things" in the initiation of the national day. Bjørnson's attitude towards the farmers remain ambiguous. His father himself was a farmer's son. During the last twenty years of his life he wrote hundreds of articles in major European papers. He attacked the French justice in the Dreyfus Affair, and he fought for the rights of children in Slovakia to learn their own mother tongue. "To detach children from their mother tongue is identical to tearing them away from their mothers breasts," he wrote.
Bjørnson wrote in multiple newspapers about the Černová massacre under the title The greatest industry of Hungary – which was supposedly 'to produce Magyars'.

Last years

Bjørnson was, from the beginning of the Dreyfus Affair, a staunch supporter of Alfred Dreyfus, and, according to a contemporary, wrote "article after article in the papers and proclaimed in every manner his belief in his innocence". 

Bjørnson was one of the original members of the Norwegian Nobel Committee, that awards the Nobel Peace Prize, where he sat from 1901 to 1906. In 1903 he was awarded the Nobel Prize in Literature.

In 1901, Bjørnson proclaimed, "I'm a Pan-Germanist, I'm a Teuton, and the greatest dream of my life is for the South Germanic peoples and the North Germanic peoples and their brothers in diaspora to unite in a fellow confederation."

Bjørnson had done as much as any other man to rouse Norwegian nationalistic feeling, but in 1903, on the verge of the rupture between Norway and Sweden, he preached conciliation and moderation to the Norwegians. However, in 1905 he largely remained silent.

When Norway was attempting to dissolve the forced union with Sweden, Bjørnson sent a telegram to the Norwegian Prime minister stating, "Now is the time to unite." The minister replied, "Now is the time to shut up."

This was in fact a satirical illustration published in Vikingen, but the story got so popular and widespread that Bjørnson had to deny it, claiming that "Michelsen has never asked me to shut up; it would not help if he did".

He died on 26 April 1910 in Paris, where for some years he had spent his winters, and was buried at home with every mark of honour. The Norwegian coastal defence ship  was sent to convey his remains back to his own land.

Bjørnson's family

Bjørnson was the son of the Reverend Mr. Peder Bjørnson and Inger Elise Nordraach. He married Karoline Reimers (1835–1934) in 1858. They had six children, five of whom lived to adulthood:
Bjørn Bjørnson (1859–1942)
Einar Bjørnson (1864–1942)
Erling Bjørnson (1868–1959)
Bergliot Bjørnson (1869–1953)
Dagny Bjørnson (1871–1872)
Dagny Bjørnson (1876–1974)

Karoline Bjørnson remained at Aulestad until her death in 1934.

In his early fifties, Bjørnson had an affair with 17-year-old Guri Andersdotter (d. 1949), which resulted in the birth of their son, Anders Underdal (1880–1973). The affair was kept a secret, though early on Anders Underdal, a poet, would talk about his origins with his children. Later in life he stopped discussing the matter, no reason was given. Anders was the father of Norwegian-Swedish author Margit Sandemo. Audun Thorsen has written a book about Bjørnson's affair; "Bjørnsons kvinne og Margit Sandemos "familiehemmelighet"  (Genesis forlag, Oslo 1999).

Bibliography
Mellem Slagene, (Between the Battles) saga drama, 1857
Synnøve Solbakken, peasant story, 1857
Arne, 1859
En glad Gut, (A Happy Boy) 1860
Halte-Hulda, (Lame Hulda) 1858
Kong Sverre, (King Sverre) 1861
Sigurd Slembe, (Sigurd the Bad) 1862
Maria Stuart i Skotland, (Mary Stuart in Scotland) 1863
De Nygifte, (The Newly Married) 1865
Fiskerjenten, 1868
Arnljot Gelline, epic cycle 1870
Digte og Sange, (Poems and Songs) 1880
Brudeslåtten, peasant story, 1872
Sigurd Jorsalfar, saga drama, 1872
En fallit, (The Bankrupt) drama, 1875
Redaktøren, (The Editor) drama, 1875
Kaptejn Mansana, (Captain Mansana) novel, 1875
Kongen, (The King) 1877
Magnhild, 1877
Det ny system, (The New System) 1879
Leonarda, 1879
En hanske (A Gauntlet), 1883
Støv (Dust), 1882
Over ævne, første stykke, (Beyond Human Power – I) 1883
Det flager i byen og på havnen, (translated as "The Heritage of the Kurts") 1884
På guds veje, (In God's Way) 1889
Fred, oratorium, 1891
Over ævne, annet stykke, (Beyond Human Power – II) 1895
Paul Lange og Tora Parsberg, 1898
Daglannet, 1904
Når den ny vin blomstrer, (When the New Wine Blooms) 1909
Norges Vel, cantata, 1909

See also
 Nordic sexual morality debate

References

Sources
 Brandes, Georg (1899). Henrik Ibsen. Björnstjerne Björnson. Critical Studies. London: William Heinemann. 
 Payne, William Morton (1910). Björnstjerne Björnson, 1832–1910. Chicago: A.C. McClurg & Co.
 Collin, Christen (1907). Bjørnstjerne Bjørnson hans Barndom og Ungdom. Kristiania: H. Aschehoug & Co.
 Larson, Harold (1944). Bjørnstjerne Bjørnson: A Study in Norwegian Nationalism. New York: King's Crown Press.
 Haugen, Eva Lund; and Einar Haugen (1978). Bjørnson: Land of the Free. Bjørnstjerne Bjørnson's American Letters 1880–1881. Northfield, Minn.: Norwegian-American Historical Association.
 Haugen, Einar (1978). The Vocabulary of Bjørnson's Literary Works. N.Y.: Columbia University Press.
 Amdam, Per (1978). Bjørnstjerne Bjørnson. J.W. Cappelen.

Further reading
 Boyesen, Hjalmar Hjorth (1873). "Björnstjerne Björnson as a Dramatist," The North American Review, Vol. 116, No. 238, pp. 109–138.
 Boyesen, Hjalmar Hjorth (1895). "Bjørnstjerne Bjørnson." In: Essays on Scandinavian Literature. New York: Charles Scribner's Sons. 
 Brandes, Georg (1886). "Bjørnstjerne Bjørnson." In: Eminent Authors of the Nineteenth Century. New York: Thomas Y. Crowell Company.
 Buchanan, Robert (1872). "Bjørnstjerne Bjørnson," The Contemporary Review 21, pp. 45–62.
 Gosse, Edmund (1890). "Norwegian Poetry Since 1814." In: Northern Studies. London: Walter Scott.  
 Jorgenson, Theodore (1933). "Bjørnstjerne Bjørnson." In: History of Norwegian Literature. New York: The Macmillan Company.
 Lewisohn, Ludwig (1915). "The Scandinavian Theater." In: The Modern Drama, an Essay in Interpretation. New York: B.W Huebsch. 
 Naess, Harald S. (1993). A History of Norwegian Literature. University of Nebraska Press.
 Nordberg, Carl E. (1920). The Peasant Stories of Bjørnstjerne Bjørnson. Minneapolis, Minn.: The Free Church Book Concern.
 Payne, William Morton (1903). "Bjørnstjerne Bjørnson," The International Quarterly 7, pp. 171–191.
 Phelps, William Lyon (1918). "Bjørnstjerne Bjørnson." In: Essays on Modern Novelists. New York: The Macmillan Company. 
 Quiller-Couch, A.T. (1896). "Bjørnstjerne Bjørnson." In: Adventures in Criticism. London: Cassell & Company, pp. 346–354.
 Schmiesing, Ann (2004). "The Christiania Theater and Norwegian Nationalism: Bjørnson's Defense of the 1856 Whistle Concerts in 'Pibernes Program'," Scandinavian Studies, Vol. 76, No. 3, pp. 317–340.
 Willcox, Louise Collier (1910). "Bjornstjerne Bjornson," The North American Review, Vol. 192, No. 656, pp. 44–55.

External links

 Digitized books and manuscripts by Bjørnson in the National Library of Norway
 
 List of works
  (a biographical essay, 1910, by William Morton Payne, a translator of various works by Bjørnson)
 
 
 Bjørnstjerne Bjørnson bibliography : newspaper articles and speeches by Bjørnson 1850–1910, literature on Bjørnson 1861–2010 (National Library of Norway)
 Bjørnstjerne Bjørnson monument by Sigvald Asbjornsen
 

1832 births
1910 deaths
People from Tynset
19th-century Norwegian dramatists and playwrights
19th-century Norwegian novelists
20th-century Norwegian novelists
Nobel laureates in Literature
Norwegian Nobel laureates
Norwegian newspaper editors
Burials at the Cemetery of Our Saviour
People from Molde
People from Gausdal
National anthem writers
The Four Greats
Language reformers